Tommy Mac (born April 25, 1971) is a Canadian bassist and singer. He was the bassist of the rock band Hedley. Mac currently plays in a band called Day of the Dog as of 2021.

Career

Earlier Work
Before joining Hedley, Mac revealed in an interview that he was in a band called "Jar.". Mac was also in groups such as BigFATScratch and Loco. Mac was a part of a band called Everything After with Dave Rosin and Chris Crippin who would later join Hedley.

Hedley
Tommy Mac joined the group, Hedley as the bassist. Their debut single, On My Own, reached number 1 on the Canadian Singles Chart. Throughout his time with the band, they have released 7 albums in which all their albums but Cageless got certified platinum. Their single Kiss You Inside Out peaked at number 2 on the Canadian Hot 100 which is their highest peaked song on that chart. Anything is currently their best selling song as it has been certified 4× Platinum. In 2018, the band took an indefinite hiatus after sexual assault allegations have been brought up against Jacob Hoggard, the frontman of the band.

Personal life
Outside of the band, Mac had opened up his own studio called The Beat Lab Studio. It was revealed that in 2011, Tommy Mac was diagnosed with an undisclosed form of cancer, in the second stage of the disease. He underwent treatment and is in good health today.

Discography
Jar. / Flybanger
 Knott Skull (1998)
 Outlived (2000) [EP]
 Headtrip to Nowhere (2001)

BigFATScratch
 Laff (2002) [Single]

Loco
 Dead World (2002)

Hedley
 Hedley (2005)
 Try This at Home (2006) [DVD]
 Famous Last Words (2007)
 The Show Must Go (2009)
 iTunes Sessions (2010) [EP]
 Go with the Show (2010)
 Storms (2011)
 Wild Life (2013)
 Hello (2015)
 Cageless (2017)

References

External links
 

1977 births
Living people
Musicians from British Columbia
Canadian rock bass guitarists
People from Langley, British Columbia (city)
People from Lahr
German emigrants to Canada
German people of Canadian descent
Canadian punk rock bass guitarists
21st-century Canadian bass guitarists